Marie Arago, born Marie-Anne Roig (3 November 1755 – 5 September 1845) was a French woman, wife of François Bonaventure Arago and mother of François, Jean, Jacques, Victor, Joseph and Étienne Arago.
She raised her eight children alone after the death of her husband in 1814, passed on her human values and encouraged them to pursue their studies. 
An "Arago clan" was formed around her eldest son, François, at the Paris Observatory, including Claude-Louis Mathieu (who married his sister Marguerite), Alexander von Humboldt and  Félix Savary.

Biography

Origins and youth (1755–1778)

Marie-Anne-Agathe Roig was born on 3 November 1755 in Corneilla-la-Rivière, a village of about 700 inhabitants in the province of Roussillon, a Catalan language region that had belonged to France since 1659. 
Her father, François Roig, was a "pagès", a well-to-do peasant, from Corneilla-la-Riviere. 
He was a soldier with the rank of an officer. 
Her paternal grandfather, Camo Roig, was a doctor.
Her paternal uncle was pastor of Ponteilla.
This is another village in the same region of southern France, about a dozen kilometers southeast of Corneilla-la-Rivière.

Her mother, named Victoire Brial, was the daughter of a "pagès" of Camélas.
This village is also located about twelve kilometers from Corneilla-la-Rivière, but south-southwest.

At a time when almost all women in the region were illiterate (90% of women of her generation were unable to sign their marriage certificates), she learned to read and write alone, while hiding, from books written in Latin.

Estagel (1778–1797)

On 12 August 1778, with a dowry of 2,200 livres, she married François Bonaventure Arago in Corneilla-la-Rivière.
He was a pagès with a degree in law.
They would have eleven children.
They raised them in the local Catalan language.
The couple moved to Estagel, a Roussillon town of 1,000 inhabitants.
It is located a dozen kilometers north of Corneilla-la-Rivière.

François Bonaventure Arago was of the same social background as Marie Roig. 
A farmer and moderately well-off proprietor, he was orphaned at a very young age and was raised by an uncle, a priest who enrolled him in law school in Perpignan. 
His social background, however, did not allow him to take a more prestigious job as a notary or lawyer.

In 1779 Marie Arago gave birth to a daughter, Marie-Rose, who died in 1780. 
1780 was also the year of the birth and death of Arago's second daughter, Marie-Thérèse. 
A third girl, named Marie-Victoire, was born and died in infancy in 1783. 
Meanwhile, in 1782, the couple gave birth to another daughter, Rose, who lived until 1832.
In 1781 her husband began a political career, gradually climbing the ladder in the municipal affairs of the village of Estagel until becoming, from June 1786 to June 1787, first consul of the village, which corresponds to the mandate of a mayor today. 
In 1789, he wrote a large part of the Cahiers de doléances (Book of grievances) of Estagel. 
He became in 1790 the first mayor of the commune newly created by the revolution, then in the following years was given high departmental responsibilities.
Mary gave birth to other children: François (1786), Jean (1788), Jacques (1790), Victor (1792), Joseph (1796) and Marguerite (1798). 
All were born in Estagel.

During the War of the Pyrenees in 1793 François Bonaventure commanded the National Guard of Estagel.
This was an army of volunteer citizens formed to defend the Revolution against the Spanish enemy. 
The family gave lodgings to many French soldiers and officers, to which François, the eldest son, then aged seven, would later attribute his taste for military matters.

Perpignan (1797–1816)

Return to Estagel (1816–1845)

After the death of her daughter Rose, Marie Arago became, at age 77, the guardian of Rose's four children.

Famille et entourage 

According to Muriel Toulotte, biographer of Étienne Arago, "all her life, Marie Arago had a huge influence on her children and also on all those around her".
The children of Marie and François Bonaventure Arago all behaved with righteousness and honesty, following the example of their father. 
From their mother, they gained at the same time the dynamism that animated them, kindness towards others and great gaiety.
On the other hand, the boys were much less religious than their mother.
Jacques was not a believer and Étienne went as far as asking to be buried without any religious ceremony.

She had six sons, all of whom distinguished themselves:
 François (1786–1853), astronomer, physician and French politician 
Jean (1788–1836), cashier of the mint of Perpignan, then illustrious soldier in Mexico
Jacques (1790–1854), novelist, playwright and explorer
Victor (1792–1867), polytechnic, soldier
Joseph (1796–1860), soldier in the Mexican army;
Étienne (1802–1892), playwright and politician, mayor of Paris in 1870.

She also gave birth to five daughters, only two of whom survived infancy: Rose (1782–1832) and Marguerite (1798–1859), who married Claude-Louis Mathieu in 1824.

Notes

Sources

1755 births
1845 deaths
18th-century French women
19th-century French women
People from Pyrénées-Orientales
Education in Occitania (administrative region)
People from Catalonia